This is a list of episodes for the anime Minami-ke, a story about the everyday lives of the three Minami sisters who live on their own and the problems they face in everyday life with their friends at school and at home. The manga, created by Koharu Sakuraba, was adapted into an anime series by three studios.

The anime series consists of four seasons. Each of them spanning 13 episodes. The first season produced by Daume first aired on October 7, 2007 and was directed by Masahiko Ohta. The second season was produced by Asread, was directed by Naoto Hosada, and first aired January 6, 2008. The third season, also produced by Asread, aired January 4, 2009 and features Kei Oikawa as the director. The fourth season produced by Feel first aired on January 6, 2013, and features Keiichiro Kawaguchi as the director.

Episode list

Minami-ke (2007)

Theme songs
Opening theme

Performed by: Rina Satō, Marina Inoue, and Minori Chihara
Lyricist: Uran
Composition and arrangement by: Kaoru Okubo
Released October 24, 2007

Ending theme

Performed by: Rina Satō, Marina Inoue, and Minori Chihara
Lyricist: Uran
Composition by: Akirahiko Yamaguchi
Arrangement by: Tomoki Kikuya

Minami-ke: Okawari (2008)

Theme songs
Opening theme

Performed by: Rina Satō, Marina Inoue, and Minori Chihara

Ending theme

Performed by: Rina Satō, Marina Inoue, and Minori Chihara

Minami-ke: Okaeri (2009)

Theme songs
Opening theme

Performed by: Rina Satō, Marina Inoue, and Minori Chihara

Ending theme

Performed by: Rina Satō, Marina Inoue, and Minori Chihara

Minami-ke: Tadaima (2013)

Theme songs
Opening theme

Performed by: Rina Satō, Marina Inoue, and Minori Chihara
Lyricist: Uran
Composition and arrangement by: Kaoru Ōkubo

Ending theme

Performed by: Rina Satō, Marina Inoue, and Minori Chihara
Lyricist: Uran
Composition by: Akirahiko Yamaguchi
Arrangement by: Tomoki Kikuya

OVAs

Minami-ke: Betsubara (2009)

Theme songs

Opening theme

Performed by: Rina Satō, Marina Inoue, and Minori Chihara

Ending theme

Performed by: Rina Satō, Marina Inoue, and Minori Chihara

Minami-ke: Omatase (2012)

Theme songs

Opening theme

Performed by: Rina Satō, Marina Inoue, and Minori Chihara

Ending theme

Performed by: Rina Satō, Marina Inoue, and Minori Chihara

Minami-ke: Natsuyasumi  (2013)

References

External links
 Minami-ke Official Anime Site 
 Minami-ke: Okawari Official Anime Site 
 Minami-ke: Okaeri Official Anime Site 

Minami-ke